The Southern Media Corporation (SMC) is a television network based in Guangzhou, Guangdong.  It was found on 18 January 2004 between the merge of Guangdong Television (GDTV) and Southern Television (TVS). At the same time the television network expanded its service to Hong Kong, Macau and North America to compete with Television Broadcasts Limited (TVB) and Asia Television (aTV), other major Cantonese language TV networks.

Sub-Network
 Guangdong Television
 Southern Television
 Radio Guangdong

Predecessor
 Guangdong Radio and Television

References

External links
 SMC Home

Television networks in China
Television channels and stations established in 2004
Mass media in Guangzhou